The Marapendi Natural Reserve ( is a coastal nature preserve (environmental protection zone) of approximately 665.62 hectares, located in the Barra da Tijuca and Recreio neighborhoods of Rio de Janeiro, Brazil, established for the preservation of native plants and animals such as the Paraná and jacarandas pines, restinga, mangroves and the Channel-billed toucan.

The legal boundaries of the preserve extend over the Marapendi Natural Municipal Park (  and some developed areas with a small number of commercial tenants permitted within the inner sanctuary.

2016 Summer Olympics

The Olympic golf course is a new venue built for the golf tournaments of the 2016 Summer Olympics.

Gallery

References

External links
HMarapendi: lutas passadas, lutas presentes alfredosirkis.blogspot.com 

Golf in an environmental protection zone urbecarioca.blogspot.com 
Reserva Marapendi Golf Course rio2016.com
2016 Rio Olympics Golf: The course golf-monthly.co.uk
Hanse Golf Course Design hansegolfdesign.com

Geography of Rio de Janeiro (city)
Parks in Rio de Janeiro (city)
Tourist attractions in Rio de Janeiro (city)
Venues of the 2016 Summer Olympics